Estradiol benzoate/testosterone isobutyrate (EB/TiB), sold under the brand names Femandren M and Folivirin, is an injectable combination medication of estradiol benzoate (EB), an estrogen, and testosterone isobutyrate (TiB), an androgen/anabolic steroid, which is used in menopausal hormone therapy for women. It is provided in the form of 1 mL ampoules containing 2.5 mg estradiol benzoate and 25 mg testosterone isobutyrate in a microcrystalline aqueous suspension and is administered by intramuscular injection once every 4 to 6 weeks. EB/TiB reportedly has a duration of about 14 to 21 days.

The medication is available only in the Czech Republic and Slovakia. EB/TiB was originally developed and marketed by the Swiss pharmaceutical company Ciba and was introduced for medical use by 1953, following the development of testosterone isobutyrate in 1952. It was intermittently manufactured by Spofa and then Biotika and is now manufactured by BB Pharma.

The effect of EB/TiB on gonadotropin levels in postmenopausal women have been studied.

An oral tablet product with the same brand name of Femandren, containing ethinylestradiol and methyltestosterone, was marketed around the same time as Femandren M, and should not be confused with the injectable formulation.

See also
 Estradiol benzoate/progesterone
 List of combined sex-hormonal preparations
 List of sex-hormonal aqueous suspensions

References

Combined estrogen–androgen formulations